William Welply (25 December 1912 – 24 June 1970) was a British sailor. He competed in the Star event at the 1936 Summer Olympics.

References

External links
 

1912 births
1970 deaths
British male sailors (sport)
Olympic sailors of Great Britain
Sailors at the 1936 Summer Olympics – Star
People from West Ham